In 1995 there were eight national newspapers in the Czech Republic and their total circulation was about 1.8 million copies. The number of daily newspapers was 96 in 2004.

Major national newspapers

Paid classified advertising newspaper Anonce is published four times per week, with a circulation of 306 thousand copies in 2015.

This is a list of weekly newspapers published in the Czech Republic, not including magazines.

German newspapers in the Czech Republic 
Landeszeitung der Deutschen in Böhmen, Mähren und Schlesien (bi-weekly)
Prager Zeitung

Defunct newspapers of the Czech Republic
 Brno Noppeisen
 Ostrauer Volksblatt, German-language social democrat newspaper, later a communist newspaper
 Prague Business Journal
 The Prague Post, English-language newspaper, ceased printing in 2013
 Munkás, Hungarian-language Communist newspaper

See also
 List of magazines in the Czech Republic

References

Czech Republic
Newspapers
List